Andriy Rostyslavovych Bobliakh (born 5 March 1985) is a Ukrainian comedian and politician currently serving as a People's Deputy of Ukraine representing Ukraine's 145th electoral district as a member of Servant of the People since 2019.

Early life and career 
Andriy Rostyslavovych Bobliakh was born on 5 March 1985 in the town of Karmėlava, in Lithuania.

In 2013, Bobliakh moved to Poltava. Here, he became a comedian, participating in multiple television shows and founding the Manhattan Kids comedy club, as well as the Poltava Student Comedy Club, Poltava School Comedy Club, and Doubleyou studio, the latter of which was a merger of the Manhattan and SMT comedy studios.

Political career 
In the 2012 Ukrainian parliamentary election, Bobliakh was an unsuccessful candidate for People's Deputy of Ukraine, placed 149th on the party list of the Socialist Party of Ukraine.

Bobliakh was a Servant of the People candidate for People's Deputy of Ukraine in the 2019 Ukrainian parliamentary election, contesting the election in Ukraine's 145th electoral district. At the time of the election, he was an independent. This time, he was successfully elected, defeating incumbent  (running as an independent, formerly a member of Svoboda) with 49.16% of the vote. Bublyk, by comparison, garnered only 9.86% of the vote.

In the Verkhovna Rada (Ukraine's national parliament), Bobliakh joined the Servant of the People faction, the Verkhovna Rada Committee on Humanitarian and Informational Policy, and the inter-factional association Blockchain4Ukraine. Since July 2020, he has also been chairman of the Poltava regional committee of Servant of the People. Bobliakh was criticised by anti-corruption non-governmental organisation Chesno for his 2022 vote in favour of urban planning reform for reconstruction following the 2022 Russian invasion of Ukraine, which Chesno claimed was in the interests of construction companies rather than the people of Ukraine.

References 

1985 births
Living people
Ninth convocation members of the Verkhovna Rada
People from Kaunas District Municipality
Servant of the People (political party) politicians